The Prix du Cercle du livre de France is a literary prize created by the Quebec publishing house Le Cercle du livre de France with the aim of promoting Quebec authors. From 1977 to 1985, the prize was offered by Esso Canada and was renamed Prix littéraire Esso du Cercle du livre de France.

Prize recipients 
 1950 - Bertrand Vac - Louise Genest
 1951 - André Langevin - Évadé de la nuit
 1952 - Bertrand Vac - Deux portes, une adresse
 1953 - André Langevin - Poussière sur la ville
 1954 - Jean Vaillancourt - Les Canadiens errants
 1955 - Jean Filiatrault - Chaînes
 1956
 Maurice Gagnon - L'Échéance
 Eugène Cloutier - Les Inutiles
 Jean Simard - Mon fils pourtant heureux...
 1957 - Jean-Marie Poirier - Le Prix du souvenir
 1958 - Claire Martin - Avec ou sans amour
 1959 - Pierre Gélinas - Les Vivants, les morts et les autres
 1960 - Claude Jasmin - La Corde au cou
 1961 - Diane Giguère - Le Temps des jeux
 1962 - No recipient
 1963 - Louise Maheux-Forcier - Amadou
 1964 - Georges Cartier - Le Poisson pêché
 1965 - Bertrand Vac - Histoires galantes
 1966 - André Berthiaume - La Fugue
 1967 - Anne Bertrand - Cancer
 1968 - Yvette Naubert - L'Été de la cigale
 1969 - Jovette Bernier - Non monsieur
 1970 - No recipient
 1971 - Lise Parent - Les Îles flottantes
 1972 - No recipient
 1973 - Huguette Légaré - La Conversation entre hommes
 1974 - Jean-Pierre Guay - Mise en liberté
 1975 - Pierre Stewart - L'Amour d'une autre
 1976 - No recipient
 1977 - Simone Piuze - Les Cercles concentriques
 1978 - Négovan Rajic - Les Hommes-taupes
 1979 - Normand Rousseau - Les Jardins secrets
 1980 - Françoise Dumoulin-Tessier - Le Salon vert
 1981 - Lise Blouin - Miroir à deux visages
 1982 - Josette Labbé - Jean-Pierre, mon homme, ma mère
 1983 - Jean-François Somcynsky - La Frontière du milieu
 1984 - Gilbert Choquette - La Forge et la flamme
 1985 - Alexander Lahaye - Opération Bernhard II

References 

Canadian literary awards
French-language literary awards